San Fernando, officially the City of San Fernando, is the most populous city and second most populous municipality in Trinidad and Tobago, after Chaguanas. Sando, as it is known to many local Trinidadians, occupies 19 km² and is located in the southwestern part of the island of Trinidad. It is bounded to the north by the Guaracara River, the south by the Oropouche River, the east by the Sir Solomon Hochoy Highway, and the west by the Gulf of Paria. The former borough was elevated to the status of a city corporation on 18 November 1988. The motto of San Fernando is: "Sanitas Fortis" - In a Healthy Environment We Will Find Strength. San Fernando is called Trinidad and Tobago's "industrial capital" because of its proximity to the Pointe-à-Pierre oil refinery and many other petrochemical, LNG, iron and steel and aluminium smelters in places such as Point Lisas in Couva, Point Fortin, and La Brea.

Geography

San Fernando is a coastal city. It is bounded by the Guaracara River to the north, the Sir Solomon Hochoy Highway to the east, the Southern Main Road to the southeast, and the Oropouche River to the south. The city proper is located on the flanks of two hills – San Fernando Hill (formerly known as Naparima Hill) and Alexander Hill. Several mansions on the pinnacle of Alexander Hill house belong to some of the more prominent San Fernandian families. The Cipero, Vistabella, Marabella and Godineau Rivers all enter the sea within the city limits.

Climate
San Fernando has a tropical monsoon climate with a wet season lasting from May to January and a dry season lasting from February to April.

Demographics

Ancestry

Infrastructure

Health 
The San Fernando General Hospital is located on Independence Avenue, close to the city center. It is considered the main trauma unit for the southern part of the island, and is administered by the Southwest Regional Health Authority (SWRHA).

There are numerous health centres in towns and villages around San Fernando that are considered to be part of the urban area. There are also a number of private medical institutions, such as:

 Southern Medical Clinic
 Surgi-Med Clinic
 Gulf View Medical Center

The San Fernando Teaching Hospital is connected to the San Fernando General Hospital by a skybridge, and is the main teaching hospital.

Transport

Road 
San Fernando is dominated by private car commuting and has a very dense network of roadways. There are numerous points of entry into the city.

 The Reinzi Kirton Highway runs from Cipero Street to Ruth Avenue, where it becomes Independence Avenue. 
 The San Fernando Bypass runs along the outskirts of the city, providing access to many of the suburban areas. 
 The Golconda Connector Road connects the Sir Solomon Hochoy Highway to Cipero Street & the San Fernando Bypass. The Tarouba Link Road also connects the Sir Solomon Hochoy Highway to the San Fernando Bypass at the northern end of the city.
 Alternatively, traffic can exit at Corinth and enter the city via the Naparima Mayaro Road and Royal Road, or via Pleasantville. 
 Lady Hailes Avenue runs from Cipero Street to Kings Wharf along the city's waterfront, connecting to the Reinzi Kirton Highway/Independence Avenue at only three points. It serves as a quicker point of entry to the city center as it terminates just outside the city center. There are plans to widen Lady Hailes Avenue into a four-lane dual carriageway, much of which has already been completed, as part of the waterfront revitalization project.

The city is often plagued by heavy traffic delays.

Public Transport 
The San Fernando Bus Terminal is located to the North of Kings Wharf. There are numerous taxi stands around High Street. The water taxi service links San Fernando to Port of Spain via sea in approximately 1 hour.

Air 
Like the rest of the island, the city is served by Piarco International Airport, approximately 37 km away from the city center.

Prominent San Fernandians
 Stephen Ames (born 1964), PGA Tour golfer
 Eugene Chen (Chen Youren) (1878–1944), Foreign Minister of China
 Hasely Crawford (born 1950), Olympic gold medalist (1976)
 Annie Dookhan (born 1977), convicted felon and former chemist
 Hedy Fry, PC, MP (born 1941), Trinidadian-born Canadian politician and physician
 Noor Hassanali (1918–2006), President of Trinidad and Tobago (1987–1997)
 Rikki Jai (born 1986), chutney and chutney soca artist
 Christina F. Lewis (1919–1974) Pan-African community worker, trade unionist and women's rights activist
 Patrick Manning (1946–2016), Prime Minister of Trinidad and Tobago (1991–1995, 2002–2010)
 Sir Trevor McDonald (born 1939), news reporter
 Mishael Morgan (born 1986), TV actress
 Manny Ramjohn (1915–1998), long-distance runner; first person to win a gold medal for Trinidad and Tobago at a major athletics event
 Jean Ramjohn-Richards (born 1936), First Lady of Trinidad and Tobago (2003–2013)
 George Maxwell Richards (1931–2018), President of Trinidad and Tobago (2003–2013)
 Adrian Cola Rienzi (Krishna Deonarine) (1905–1972) 
 Samuel Selvon (1923–1994), writer
 Jlloyd Samuel (1981–2018), footballer
 Jerome Tang (born 1966), head men's basketball coach at Kansas State University
 Sullivan Walker (1946–2012), film and television actor

References

External links

 
Ports and harbours of Trinidad and Tobago
Municipalities of Trinidad and Tobago
Populated places established in 1784
1784 establishments in New Spain
1780s establishments in the Spanish West Indies
Populated coastal places in Trinidad and Tobago
Cities in Trinidad and Tobago